Diego Gama de Oliveira (born 6 May 1983 in Santos, São Paulo), is a Brazilian footballer.

Career

In February 2015, he signed with Gresik United.

Honours
Hougang United
Runner-up
 Singapore League Cup: 2011

References

External links
 Lunch with... Diego Gama- FourFourTwo
 
 
 http://www.phnompenhpost.com/sport/top-four-eager-keep-momentum-going
 http://www.phnompenhpost.com/sport/naga-down-svay-rieng-shake-mcl
 http://www.phnompenhpost.com/sport/naga-down-army-kirivong-hold-crown
 http://www.phnompenhpost.com/sport/seventh-heaven-gisung-mcl-goalfest

1983 births
Living people
Brazilian footballers
Association football forwards
Brazilian expatriate footballers
Brazilian expatriate sportspeople in Portugal
Expatriate footballers in Indonesia
Liga 1 (Indonesia) players
Singapore Premier League players
Primeira Liga players
Brazilian expatriate sportspeople in Bolivia
Expatriate footballers in Singapore
Brazilian expatriate sportspeople in Indonesia
La Paz F.C. players
C.D. Aves players
Persegres Gresik players
Gresik United players
Expatriate footballers in Cambodia
Viettel FC players
Nagaworld FC players
Brazilian expatriate sportspeople in Cambodia
Sportspeople from Santos, São Paulo